is a city located in Gifu, Japan. , the city had an estimated population of 48,777, and a population density of 96.7 persons per km², in 19,820 households.

Geography
Ena is located in the Tōnō region of southeastern Gifu Prefecture. 
Mountains: Mount Kasagi, Mount Hoko, Mount Yūdachi, Mount Byōbu, Mount Yake, Mount Mitsumori
Rivers: Kiso River, Agi River, Kamiyahagi River, Kamimura River, Akechi River, Toki River, Ori River
Lakes: Ena Gorge, Lake Hokonoko, Lake Agigawa, Lake Okuyahagi, Lake Origawa

Climate
The city has a climate characterized by characterized by hot and humid summers, and mild winters (Köppen climate classification Cfa).

Neighbouring municipalities
Gifu Prefecture
Nakatsugawa
Mizunami
Shirakawa
Yaotsu
Nagano Prefecture
Neba
Hiraya
Aichi Prefecture
Toyota

Demographics
Per Japanese census data, the population of Ena has declined over the past 40 years.

History
The area around Ena was part of traditional Mino Province, and the name of "Ena" appears in Nara period records, including the Nihon Shoki.  During the Edo period, it was mostly controlled by Iwamura Domain, and  Ōi-juku developed as a post town on the Nakasendō highway connecting Edo with Kyoto. During the post-Meiji restoration cadastral reforms, the area was organised into Ena District, Gifu.

The city was founded on April 1, 1954 by the merger of two towns (Oi and Osashima) and six villages (Tōnō, Sango, Takenami, Kasagi, Nakano, and Iiji), all from Ena District. On October 25, 2004, Ena absorbed the towns of Akechi, Iwamura, Kamiyahagi and Yamaoka, and the village of Kushihara (all from Ena District) to create the expanded city of Ena.

Government
Ena has a mayor-council form of government with a directly elected mayor and a unicameral city legislature of 18 members.

Subdivisions
Ōi-chō (大井町)
Osashima-chō (長島町)
Takenami-chō (武並町)
Misato-chō (三郷町)
Kasagi-chō (笠置町)
Iiji-chō (飯地町)
Nakanohō-chō (中野方町)
Higashino (東野)
Iwamura-chō (岩村町)
Yamaoka-chō (山岡町)
Akechi-chō (明智町)
Kamiyahagi-chō (上矢作町)
Kushihara (串原)

Economy
Ena was noted for its pulp and paper industry for many years. Production of precision instruments dominates the manufacturing sector.

Education
Ena has 14 public elementary schools and eight public middle schools operated by the city government, and three public high schools operated by the Gifu Prefectural Board of Education. The prefecture also operates one special education school. Chubu University maintains a subsidiary campus in Ena.

Transportation

Railway
  JR Central - Chūō Main Line
  – 
 Akechi Railway - (Akechi Line): 
 –  – <  –  > –  –  –  –  –  –  - )

Highway
 Chūō Expressway: Ena Interchange - Enakyō Service Area

Local attractions
Nakasendō Ōi-juku
Hiroshige Museum of Art, Ena
Ena Gorge
 Agigawa Dam
Iwamura Castle Ruins
Hondōri Iwamura-chō
Nihon Taishō Mura
Sasayuri no Yu
Yahagi Dam
Mongol Village

Notable people from Ena
Kiyohiro Araki (member of the House of Councillors) 
Utako Shimoda (founder of Jissen Women's Educational Institute)
Kazuo Nagano (noted fraudster chairman of )

References

External links

 

 
Cities in Gifu Prefecture